Robert, Bob or Bobby Simpson may refer to:

Entertainment
 Robert Simpson (writer) (1886–1934), writer and editor
 Robert Simpson (film editor) (1910–1977), American film editor
 Robert Simpson (composer) (1921–1997), English composer
 Birth name of Rufus Hound (born 1979), comedian, actor and presenter
 Bobby Simpson (Home and Away), soap opera character
 Robert Simpson Jr., former professional name of actor Robert Fuller

Politics
 Robert Kirkpatrick Simpson (1837–1921), member of the New Zealand Legislative Council
 Robert A. Simpson (1910–1998), Alberta politician in Calgary North Hill
 Robert Simpson (Manitoba politician) (1910–1997), member of the Canadian House of Commons
 Robert B. Simpson (born 1943), director of New Brunswick Healthcare Association and New Brunswick politician
 Bob Simpson (British Columbia politician) (born 1956/7), member of Legislative Assembly of British Columbia
 Robert Simpson (Northern Ireland politician) (1923–1997), Northern Irish politician
 Robert Simpson (brewer), mayor of Barrie, Ontario, 1871–72 and 1876

Sports
 Robert Simpson (golfer) (1862–1923), Scottish golfer
 Bobby Simpson (golfer), Scottish golfer who played as a pro in the United States in the early 1900s
 Robert Simpson (hurdler) (1892–1974), American track and field athlete and coach
 Bob Simpson (Canadian football) (1930–2007), CFL football player
 Bob Simpson (cricketer) (born 1936), Australian cricketer
 Bobby Simpson (footballer, born 1888) (1888– after 1913), English footballer
 Bobby Simpson (footballer, born 1915) (1915–1994), English footballer
 Bobby Simpson (ice hockey) (born 1956), former NHL ice hockey player
 Robert Simpson (cricketer) (born 1962), English cricketer
 Bob R. Simpson, American business executive, Major League Baseball Texas Rangers co-owner

Other
 Robert Winthrop Simpson (1799–1877), rear-admiral of the Chilean Navy
 Robert Simpson (merchant) (1834–1897), Canadian businessman
 Robert Simpson (meteorologist) (1912–2014), American meteorologist
 Robert L. Simpson (Mormon) (1915–2003), American authority of The Church of Jesus Christ of Latter-day Saints
 Bob Simpson (journalist) (1944–2006), foreign correspondent for the BBC
 Robert L. Simpson Jr., artificial intelligence scientist

See also 
Robert Simson (1687–1768), Scottish mathematician
Robert Simpson-Anderson (born 1942), Chief of the South African Navy
 Simpson (name)